Sir James Laurence Cotter, 2nd Baronet (1748 – 9 February 1829) was an Anglo-Irish politician. 

Cotter was the eldest son of Sir James Cotter, 1st Baronet and Arabella Rogerson. He was a Member of Parliament in the Irish House of Commons, representing Taghmon from 1771 to 1776 and Mallow from 1783 to 1790. In 1790 he was elected in both Dingle and Castlemartyr, choosing to sit for the latter until the seat's disenfranchisement under the Acts of Union 1800.

On 9 June 1770, he succeeded to the father's baronetcy. He married, firstly, Anne Kearney, daughter of Francis Kearney. He married, secondly, Isabella Hingston, daughter of Reverend James Hingston, by whom he had seven children. Upon his death, Cotter was succeeded in his titles by his son, Sir James Cotter, 3rd Baronet.

References

1748 births
1829 deaths
18th-century Anglo-Irish people
19th-century Anglo-Irish people
Baronets in the Baronetage of Ireland
James
Irish MPs 1769–1776
Irish MPs 1783–1790
Irish MPs 1790–1797
Irish MPs 1798–1800
Members of the Parliament of Ireland (pre-1801) for County Cork constituencies
Members of the Parliament of Ireland (pre-1801) for County Wexford constituencies